San Manuel is a town, with a population of 12,310 (2020 calculation), and a municipality in the Honduran department of Cortés.

References 

Municipalities of the Cortés Department